Nicodemus was a Pharisee and a member of the Sanhedrin mentioned in three places in the Gospel of John:

 He first visits Jesus one night to discuss Jesus' teachings (John 3).
 The second time Nicodemus is mentioned, he reminds his colleagues in the Sanhedrin that the law requires that a person be heard before being judged (John 7).
 Finally, Nicodemus appears after Jesus' crucifixion to provide the customary embalming spices, and assists Joseph of Arimathea in preparing the body of Jesus for burial (John 19).

An apocryphal work under his name—the Gospel of Nicodemus—was produced in the mid-4th century, and is mostly a reworking of the earlier Acts of Pilate, which recounts the Harrowing of Hell.

Although there is no clear source of information about Nicodemus outside the Gospel of John, Ochser and Kohler (in an article in The Jewish Encyclopedia) and some historians have speculated that he could be identical to Nicodemus ben Gurion, mentioned in the Talmud as a wealthy and popular holy man reputed to have had miraculous powers. Others point out that the biblical Nicodemus is likely an older man at the time of his conversation with Jesus, while Nicodemus ben Gurion was on the scene 40 years later, at the time of the First Jewish-Roman War.

In John's Gospel 

As is the case with Lazarus, Nicodemus does not belong to the tradition of the synoptic Gospels, and is mentioned only by John, who devotes more than half of Chapter 3 of his gospel  and a few verses of Chapter 7 to Nicodemus, and lastly mentions him in Chapter 19.

The first time Nicodemus is mentioned, he is identified as a Pharisee who comes to see Jesus at night. According to the scripture, Jesus went to Jerusalem for the Passover feast. While in Jerusalem he chased the moneychangers from the temple and overturned their tables. His disciples remembered then the words of Psalm 69: "Zeal for your house will consume me." After these events "many believed in his name when they saw the signs that he was doing". When Nicodemus visits Jesus he makes reference to these events: "Rabbi, we know that you are a teacher who has come from God. For no one could perform the signs you are doing if God were not with him."().

Jesus replies: "Unless one is born again he cannot see the kingdom of God." Then follows a conversation with Nicodemus about the meaning of being "born again" or "born from above": Nicodemus explores the notion of being literally born again from one's mother's womb, but most theologians recognise that Nicodemus knew Jesus was not speaking of literal rebirth. Theologian Charles Ellicott wrote that "after the method of Rabbinic dialogue, [Nicodemus] presses the impossible meaning of the words in order to exclude it, and to draw forth the true meaning. 'You cannot mean that a man is to enter the second time into his mother’s womb, and be born. What is it, then, that you do mean?'" In this instance, Nicodemus chooses the literal (rather than the figurative) meaning of anōthen and assumes that that meaning exhausts the significance of the word.

Jesus expresses surprise, perhaps ironically, that "a teacher of Israel" does not understand the concept of spiritual rebirth:

In Chapter 7, Nicodemus advises his colleagues among "the chief priests and the Pharisees", to hear and investigate before making a judgment concerning Jesus. Their mocking response argues that no prophet comes from Galilee. Nonetheless, it is probable that he wielded a certain influence in the Sanhedrin.

Finally, when Jesus is buried, Nicodemus brought a mixture of myrrh and aloes—about 100 Roman pounds—despite embalming being generally against Jewish custom (with the exceptions of Jacob and Joseph). Nicodemus must have been a man of means; in his book Jesus of Nazareth: Holy Week, Pope Benedict XVI observes that, "The quantity of the balm is extraordinary and exceeds all normal proportions. This is a royal burial."

Veneration and liturgical commemoration 

Nicodemus is venerated as a saint in the various Eastern Churches and in the Catholic Church. The Eastern Orthodox and Byzantine-rite Catholic churches commemorate Nicodemus on the Sunday of the Myrrhbearers, celebrated on the Third Sunday of Pascha (i.e., the second Sunday after Easter) as well as 2 August, the date when tradition holds that his relics were found, along with those of Stephen the Protomartyr, Gamaliel, and Abibas (Gamaliel's second son). The traditional Roman-rite Catholic liturgical calendar lists the same feast of the finding of their relics on the following day, 3 August.

In the current Roman Martyrology of the Catholic Church, Nicodemus is commemorated along with Saint Joseph of Arimathea on 31 August. The Franciscan Order erected a church under the patronage of Saints Nicodemus and Joseph of Arimathea in Ramla.

Legacy

In art 

Nicodemus figures prominently in medieval depictions of the Deposition in which he and Joseph of Arimathea are shown removing the dead Christ from the cross, often with the aid of a ladder.

Like Joseph, Nicodemus became the object of various pious legends during the Middle Ages, particularly in connection with monumental crosses. He was reputed to have carved both the Holy Face of Lucca and the Batlló Crucifix, receiving angelic assistance with the face in particular and thus rendering the works instances of acheiropoieta.

Both of these sculptures date from at least a millennium after Nicodemus' life, but the ascriptions attest to the contemporary interest in Nicodemus as a character in medieval Europe.

In poetry 

In Henry Vaughan's "The Night," mentioning Nicodemus is significant to elaborate the poem's depiction of the night's relationship with God.

In music 

In the Lutheran prescribed readings of the 18th century, the gospel text of the meeting of Jesus and Nicodemus at night was assigned to Trinity Sunday.

In popular music, Nicodemus' name was figuratively used in Henry Clay Work's 1864 American Civil War-era piece "Wake Nicodemus", which at that time was popular in minstrel shows. In 1978 Tim Curry covered the song on his debut album Read My Lips. The song "Help Yourself" by The Devil Makes Three contains a very informal retelling of the relationship between Nicodemus and Jesus.

More recently, in 1941, "The Golden Gate Quartet", in the African-American Jubilee style, sang the Gospel "God Told Nicodemus".

In film 
Nicodemus is portrayed by Diego Matamoros in the 2003 film The Gospel of John.

In television 
Nicodemus is portrayed by Forrest Taylor in the 1952 television series The Living Bible and Erick Avari in the 2019 web television series The Chosen.

In literature 
Persuaded: The Story of Nicodemus by author David Harder is a historical fictional account on the life of Nicodemus. Harder used events and timetables for his novel found within the pages of the Passion Translation version of the Bible and brought biblical characters to life in a realistic story with the goal of keeping his book historically and scripturally accurate.

During the Protestant vs. Catholic struggle 

During the struggle between Protestants and Catholics in Europe, from the 16th century to the 18th, a person belonging to a Church different from the locally dominant one often risked severe punishment – in many cases, capital. At that time, there developed the use of "Nicodemite", usually a term of disparagement referring to a person who is suspected of public misrepresentation of their actual religious beliefs by exhibiting false appearance and concealing true beliefs.
The term was apparently introduced by John Calvin  in his 1544 Excuse à messieurs les Nicodemites. To Calvin, who opposed all veneration of saints, the fact of Nicodemus becoming a Catholic saint in no way exonerated his "duplicity". The term was originally applied mainly to crypto-protestants – hidden Protestants in a Catholic environment – later used more broadly.

United States 
The discussion with Jesus is the source of several common expressions of contemporary American Christianity, specifically, the descriptive phrase "born again" used to describe salvation or baptism by some groups, and John 3:16, a commonly quoted verse used to describe God's plan of salvation.

Daniel Burke notes that, "To blacks after the Civil War, he was a model of rebirth as they sought to cast off their old identity as slaves". Rosamond Rodman asserts that freed slaves who moved to Nicodemus, Kansas, after the Civil War named their town after him. However, the National Park Service indicates that it was more likely based on an 1864 song, "Wake Nicodemus" by Henry Clay Work, used to promote settlement in the area.

The Nicodemus National Historic Site, commemorating the only remaining western town established by African Americans during the Reconstruction Period following the American Civil War, is in Kansas.

On 16 August 1967, Martin Luther King Jr. invoked Nicodemus as a metaphor concerning the need for the United States to be "born again" in order to effectively address social and economic inequality. The speech was called "Where Do We Go From Here?", and delivered at the 11th Annual SCLC Convention in Atlanta, Georgia.

Gallery

See also 
 Saint Nicodemus, patron saint archive
 Christ's discourse with Nicodemus

Citations

General and cited references 
 Cornel Heinsdorff: Christus, Nikodemus und die Samaritanerin bei Juvencus. Mit einem Anhang zur lateinischen Evangelienvorlage (= Untersuchungen zur antiken Literatur und Geschichte, Bd.67), Berlin/New York, 2003.

External links 

 Nicodemus in The Jewish Encyclopedia
 "St. Nicodemus" in Butler's Lives of the Saints

 
Christian saints from the New Testament
Followers of Jesus
Gospel of John
Pharisees
Saints from the Holy Land
Sanhedrin
Myrrhbearers
Descent from the Cross